Thanh Nhật is a township and capital of Hạ Lang District, Cao Bằng Province, Vietnam.

References

Populated places in Cao Bằng province
District capitals in Vietnam
Townships in Vietnam